Werner Walldén (1 January 1900 – 6 March 1989) was a Finnish equestrian. He competed in the individual eventing at the 1936 Summer Olympics.

References

1900 births
1989 deaths
Finnish male equestrians
Olympic equestrians of Finland
Equestrians at the 1936 Summer Olympics